Blyth, Inc. is a Greenwich, Connecticut based marketing and manufacturing company that sells personal and decorative products. In 2001, it was the largest candlemaker in the United States. Subsidiaries include the multi-level marketing companies PartyLite and Visalus.

On May 13, 2002, Blyth announced that it has acquired all of the membership interest in CBK, Ltd., LLC, a designer and marketer of giftware and home decor, sold under the CBK brand. Blyth purchased the interests in CBK for total cash consideration of approximately $49.5 million. Midwest CBK was sold to MVP Group International in 2011. CBK was to remain obligated on its indebtedness, including approximately $4.8 million of long-term debt.

In 2012 Blyth sold the brand Sterno, which it had acquired in 1997.

In 2015, Blyth was acquired by the private equity firm Carlyle Group. Subsidiary Silver Star Brands was sold to Crosby Rock, leaving Blyth with PartyLife.

ViSalus

In 2008 Blyth began a multi-stage takeover of ViSalus, a multi-level marketing company which sells nutritional supplements and energy drinks. In the first stage of the takeover Blyth purchased a 43.6% equity interest for $14.0 million. In 2011 Blyth invested an additional $2.5 million and increasing their ownership share to 57.5%.

By August 2012 Blyth owned a 73% share of Visalus and planned a spin off of the company in an initial public offering. In September 2012, Moody's Investors Service downgraded Blyth's credit from "stable" to "negative," Blyth stated that ViSalus's growth was not properly valued, and Blyth withdrew the IPO citing uncertain market conditions.

In September 2014, ViSalus' founders and select stockholders arranged to buy back control of the company from Blyth. Blyth remained an equity holder with 10% of ViSalus's stock. The transaction eliminated Blyth's obligation to pay the co-founders $143.2 million as part of the 2008 acquisition. At the time of the transaction, ViSalus' earnings and revenue had declined from a high-point in 2012, and the company had been operating at a loss for 2013 and the first two quarters of 2014.

References

External links
Yahoo Finance overview
Blyth, Inc. SEC Filings
Interview with Robert B. Goergen Sr., Founder, Chairman and CEO at Twist.com.

Companies formerly listed on the New York Stock Exchange
Companies based in Greenwich, Connecticut
Manufacturing companies based in Connecticut
Multi-level marketing companies
Manufacturing companies established in 1976
2015 mergers and acquisitions
The Carlyle Group companies
Candles
1976 establishments in Connecticut